The Girkin Formation is a geologic formation located in the Chester Escarpment of central Kentucky, USA.  It comprises a level of Mammoth Cave and lies above the Ste. Genevieve Limestone and St. Louis Limestone and below the Big Clifty Sandstone in that area. The Girkin is a limestone Mississippian in age.

Members of the Girkin are as follows in descending order:
Beech Creek Member
Elwren Member
Reelsville Member
Sample Member
Beaver Bend Member
Bethel Member
Paoli Member

References

Geologic formations of Kentucky